The Savane River flows in the municipality of Saint-François-de-l'Île-d'Orléans, in the L'Île-d'Orléans Regional County Municipality, in the administrative region of Capitale-Nationale, in the province of Quebec, in Canada.

The lower part of this small valley is served by Chemin Royale (route 368) which runs along the southeast shore of Île d'Orléans. Besides a small forest area crossed in the upper part, agriculture constitutes the main economic activity of this small valley.

The surface of the Dauphine River is generally frozen from the beginning of December until the end of March; however, safe circulation on the ice is generally done from mid-December to mid-March. The water level of the river varies with the seasons and the precipitation; the spring flood occurs in March or April.

Geography 
The Savannah river originates from a small agricultural lake, located between two hills, in Saint-François-de-l'Île-d'Orléans.

  north-east, up to a bend in the river;
  towards the east, then towards the northeast, up to a bend of the river corresponding to the discharge of a stream (coming from the northwest);
  to the east passing near the Île d'Orléans Heliport and crossing the route 368, to its mouth.

This channel is crossed by the St. Lawrence River.

Toponymy 
The toponym "Savannah river" originates from an area designated "Savannah" at the head of the river.

The toponym "Rivière de la Savane" was formalized on February 4, 1982 at the Place Names Bank of the Commission de toponymie du Québec.

See also 

 Capitale-Nationale, an administrative region
 L'Île-d'Orléans Regional County Municipality 
 Île d'Orléans, an island
 Saint-François-de-l'Île-d'Orléans
 Chenal des Grands Voiliers
 St. Lawrence River
 List of rivers of Quebec

Notes and references 

Rivers of Capitale-Nationale
L'Île-d'Orléans Regional County Municipality